Ellon is a town in Aberdeenshire, Scotland, approximately  north of Aberdeen, lying on the River Ythan, which has one of the few undeveloped river estuaries on the eastern coast of Scotland. It is in the ancient region of Formartine. Its name is believed to derive from the Gaelic term Eilean, an island, on account of the presence of an island in the River Ythan, which offered a convenient fording point. In 1707 it was made a burgh of barony for the Earl of Buchan.

Places of interest 
Places of interest within the town include Ellon Castle Gardens, recently brought back to life by volunteers and open to the public (see website for latest opening times). They include a walled garden of historical importance, yew trees dating back 500 years and the ruins of old Ellon Castle, and the surrounding walls known as the Deer Dyke.  Ellon also has Auld Brig, a category A listed bridge across the Ythan, built in 1793 and still in use as a pedestrian bridge.

The Riverside Park offers walkways alongside the Ythan, from which herons, salmon, trout and otters may be observed.

In 2013, BrewDog built a  brewery at a cost of £7.8 million in a greenfield site just outside of Ellon. The brewery is designed to minimise carbon emissions with the use of treatment plants, biogas technology and since 2021, an anerobic digestion plant. In 2016, the brewery was expanded at a cost of £5 million including the addition of a new 300-hectolitre (hL) brew house.

Education 
The town has three primary schools:
 Ellon Primary School
 Auchterellon Primary School
 Meiklemill Primary School

Each of these schools has some type of greenspace as well as a concrete playground. These schools feed into Ellon Academy, the local secondary school, which currently has a roll of about 1200 students; however, due to ongoing residential development in the area that figure is expected to rise. A new school (Ellon Academy) was opened in July 2015, on the outskirts of Ellon.

Leisure 

Ellon has a community centre, which includes a swimming pool and café.

The Ythan Centre was a building dedicated to serving the needs of Ellon's teenage population. It is currently being used by Ellon Baptist Church who, from January 2019, began a five-year lease on the property which had been unoccupied since February 2016.

The Meadows sports centre, located on the outskirts of Ellon, has many sporting facilities and clubs, including football and rugby pitches, an astroturf pitch for hockey, a gym, and a multi-use sports hall. The Meadows is also home to Ellon United football team, the Ellon Rugby Club and Ellon Hockey Club.

Media 
The town has two weekly newspapers: the Ellon Times, published on Thursdays by Angus County Press and the Ellon Advertiser, published on Fridays by Peters of Turriff.

Housing 
Ellon has benefited from the North Sea oil demand, and is one of the main dormitory towns for Aberdeen.  It is part of the proposed Energetica corridor of development.  The population is expanding as young families seek to escape Aberdeen and move to nearby towns like Ellon, Inverurie and Banchory.  During 2006, Ellon ranked as the town with the fourth most rapidly increasing average house prices in Scotland.

Transport 

Ellon is bypassed by the A90 road, which offers convenient access to Aberdeen to the south and Peterhead and Fraserburgh to the north. Other major road links are the A920 west to Oldmeldrum and Huntly, and the A948 north to New Deer.

Regular and frequent bus services link Ellon with Aberdeen, Inverurie, Peterhead, Fraserburgh and surrounding towns and villages, serving both the town centre and Ellon Park and Ride at the eastern edge of the town.

Ellon railway station was a principal station on the Great North of Scotland Railway line that ran from Aberdeen to Fraserburgh and Peterhead. Due to the Beeching Axe, passenger services were withdrawn on the Formartine and Buchan Railway line in 1965. Freight services continued on the line until 1979 (Fraserburgh only, the Maud-Peterhead section was closed in 1970), at which point the entire line was closed.

The former railway line was purchased by Grampian Regional Council in 1981, and is now part of the National Cycling Route network.

Due to the population expansion since the North Sea Oil boom, the A90 has become overloaded between Aberdeen, Ellon and Peterhead. The Aberdeen Crossrail project has looked at reopening sections of the former railway, however as of March 2009 this is still unlikely.

The Boddam Branch that ran to Boddam via Cruden Bay started at Ellon. This closed in 1945.

Notable people
Patrick Gordon of Auchleuchries (1635–1699), general and rear admiral in Russia, chief advisor to Tsar Peter the Great 
James Gordon (British Army officer, died 1783), a British Army officer who fought in the American Revolutionary War
Rev James Robertson (1803–1860) later Moderator of the General Assembly of the Church of Scotland and first person in Britain to use bone meal as a fertiliser (on the church glebe)
Alexander Mitchell (1817–1887), U.S. Representative from Wisconsin
Teddy Scott (1929–2012), footballer, coach for Aberdeen F.C.
Tom Patey (1932–1970), mountaineer and doctor
Iain Sutherland (b. 1948), musician- The Sutherland Brothers
Paul Sturrock (b. 1956), footballer
Evelyn Glennie (b. 1965), percussionist
Fiona Campbell (b. 1981), international cricketer
Natalie Ross (b. 1989), footballer

References

External links 
Ellon Central
Ellon Castle Gardens

 
Towns in Aberdeenshire